Bistrampolis Manor is a former residential manor in Kučiai, Panevėžys district. Currently it is used as a hotel and coffee-restaurant. The manor stables are used as a concert hall, where various festivals takes place. The chapel is used as a museum of Lithuanian book smugglers. Bistrampolis Manor is also famous for its park.

History
The manor was built in 1855 in the classical style. Its name comes from its first owners, the Bistramai nobles.

References

External links
 Official website

Manor houses in Lithuania
Classicism architecture in Lithuania